Fem myror är fler än fyra elefanter (Five ants are more than four elephants) is a 1973–75 Swedish TV-series for children, hosted by Magnus Härenstam, Brasse Brännström and Eva Remaeus. The TV-series included songs and sketches with education about letters, numbers, positions (right, left, under, above, etc.), etc. Fem myror är fler än fyra elefanter was broadcast first on 19 November 1973 on TV2 by Sveriges Television and it was also broadcast as Sveriges Television's Christmas calendar . Fem myror is available for purchase on VHS and DVD and there are also PC games. The animated number segments by Owe Gustafson were later exported to the American television series Sesame Street.

About the TV-series 

Besides entertaining children, Magnus ("a pedant"), Brasse ("a slob") and Eva ("a proper person") wanted to make children interested in letters and numbers and every program (running time, ca 30 min) had 1 letter and 1 number as a theme.

The animations later in the TV-series, Monica Zetterlund and Tomas Löfdahl were voice-overs. Fem myror was produced by Bengt Linné & Lasse Haglund, the music was written by Bengt Ernryd and the lyrics were written by Magnus & Brasse. The animations were made by Owe Gustafson.

Fem myror also includes sketches, such as Brasse's fun box ("lattjo-lajban-låda"), where Brasse presents 4 animals of which 1 doesn't belong with the others and should be removed. Magnus and Eva have to guess but Brasse always thinks they're wrong; the purpose of this sketch is to teach children that one thing may have more than one property.

1977 Fem myror was broadcast as SVT's Sveriges Television's Christmas calendar. Normally julkalendern is broadcast December 1–24, but because Fem myror had one program for every letter in the Swedish alphabet, it was broadcast from 27 November and then as such, it was able to have shows for all the (then) 28 letters until December 24. (W was not considered as a separate letter until 2006, but rather as a variation of V.) 2006 Fem myror was voted 'Best children's TV-series' at Folktoppen with more than 50% of the votes.

Cast 

 Magnus Härenstam as Magnus
 Brasse Brännström as Brasse
 Eva Remaeus as Eva
 Tomas Löfdahl as narrator
 Monica Zetterlund as narrator

References 

Swedish children's television series
Swedish-language television shows
1977 in Swedish television
1970s Swedish television series
1973 Swedish television series debuts
1975 Swedish television series endings
1977 Swedish television series debuts
Sesame Street